The International Organization of Turkic Culture or TURKSOY is an international cultural organization of countries with Turkic populations, speaking languages belonging to the Turkic language family.

The General Secretary of Türksoy is Sultan Raev, the former Minister of Culture of Kyrgyzstan and deputy General Secretary of Organization of Turkic States. Türksoy has its headquarters in Ankara, Turkey.

Name 
TURKSOY was initially established as the Common Administration of Turkic Culture and Arts, and was later on renamed as International Organization of Turkic Culture. Its acronym nevertheless remained the same.

History 
The organization has its roots in meetings during 1992 in Baku and Istanbul, where the ministers of culture from Azerbaijan, Kazakhstan, Kyrgyzstan, Uzbekistan, Turkey, and Turkmenistan declared their commitment to cooperate in a joint cultural framework. Türksoy was subsequently established by an agreement signed on 12 July 1993 in Almaty.

In 1996, an official cooperation between Türksoy and UNESCO was established, involving mutual consultations and reciprocal representation.

Since its establishment, the Turkic Council has acted as an umbrella organization for Türksoy and a number of related organizations.

Member and observer states 
As of 2022, Türksoy has six founding and 8 observer members.

Members

Observers

Activities 
Since its establishment, Türksoy has been "carrying out activities to strengthen the ties of brotherhood and solidarity among Turkic peoples, transmit the common Turkic culture to future generations and introduce it to the world."

Activities and events include:
 Gatherings of artists, photographers, painters, opera singers, poets, journalists, theatre, dance and music ensembles of the Turkic World
 Monthly journal published in three languages
 Publishing works written in various Turkic languages and dialects
 Commemoration of artists, authors, poets and scholars in recognition of their valuable contribution to Turkic culture
 Symposia and conferences covering topics on the common history, language, culture and art of Turkic peoples
 Nevruz Day celebrations including concerts and events held in the UNESCO Headquarters in 2010, the United Nations General Assembly Hall in 2011, and various other countries including Germany, Austria, and the United Kingdom.

Cultural Capital of the Turkic World 

Every year, Türksoy selects one city in the Turkic world to be the "Cultural Capital of the Turkic World". The chosen city hosts a number of events to celebrate Turkic culture.

The cities that have been awarded this title are:
 2012: Astana, Kazakhstan
 2013: Eskişehir, Turkey
 2014: Kazan, Tatarstan
 2015: Merv, Turkmenistan
 2016: Shaki, Azerbaijan
 2017: Turkistan, Kazakhstan
 2018: Kastamonu, Turkey
 2019: Osh, Kyrgyzstan
 2020: Khiva, Uzbekistan
 2022: Bursa, Turkey
 2023: Shusha, Azerbaijan
 2024: Anau, Turkmenistan

Commemorative years 
Since 2010, Türksoy has selected at least one figure from Turkic culture every year to dedicate their activities to.

Funding 
Türksoy is funded by contributions paid by individual member states, local governments, universities and NGOs.

Related organizations 
The Organization of Turkic States, the Turkic Academy and the Foundation of Turkic Culture and Heritage are organizations which TURKSOY works in coordination with. TURKSOY also carries out cooperation activities with the UNESCO, the ISESCO and the International Foundation for the Humanitarian Cooperation (IFESCCO) of the Commonwealth of Independent States.

List of Secretaries-General

References

Notes

External links 

 Türksoy Website

International Organization of Turkic Culture